Ümit Ünal (born 14 April 1965 in Tire, İzmir), is a film director, screenwriter and author. He is the scriptwriter for eight Turkish feature films including Teyzem (My Aunt) (1986), Hayallerim, Askim ve Sen (My Dreams, My Love and You) (1987). His first feature film as a director is 9 which won many awards in various film festivals and was the Official Turkish Entry for the 2003 Academy Award for Best Foreign Language Film. He wrote and directed seven feature films including Istanbul Tales (Anlat İstanbul), Ara, Gölgesizler (Shadowless), Ses (The Voice), Nar (The Pomegranate), Serial Cook (Sofra Sırları) and Love, Spells and All That (Aşk, Büyü vs).

He has published four books.

He currently works as a freelance director/writer, living in Glasgow since 2020.

Filmography

As director
9 (2001)
2002 Istanbul International Film Festival – Best Turkish Film of the Year, Best Actress (Serra Yılmaz)
2002 Ankara Film Festival – Best Screenplay, Best Actor – Fikret Kuşkan 
2002 14. Ankara Film Festival – Onat Kutlar Best Script, Promising Director
Istanbul Tales (Anlat İstanbul) (2005)
2005 Istanbul International Film Festival – Best Turkish Film of the Year, Best Actress (Yelda Reynaud)
2005 Adana Golden Boll International Film Festival – Best Film, Best Editing, Best Director of Photography
2005 MedFilm Festival-Rome – Artistic Expression (Original Idea) Award
2006 Bangkok International Film Festival – Jury's Special Mention of Excellence
Ara (2007)
2008 Istanbul International Film Festival – Special Prize of the Jury, Best Actor (Serhat Tutumluer)
2008 Adana Golden Boll International Film Festival – Best Screenplay, Best Editing, Best Actress (Selen Uçer)
Shadowless (Gölgesizler) (2009)
Kaptan Feza (Captain Space) (2010)
SES (The Voice) (2010)
NAR (The Pomegranate) (2011)
2011 Antalya Golden Orange Film Festival – Special Jury Award
Sofra Sırları (Serial Cook) (2018)
2018 Istanbul Film Festival
Special Jury Award
Best Screenplay
Best Actress (Demet Evgar)
Best Editing
2019 Yala International Film Festival, Nepal – Best Director
2019 Dhaka International Film Festival, Bangladesh – Best Actress 
Aşk, Büyü vs (Love, Spells and All That) (2019)
2020 Istanbul Film Festival
Best Screenplay
Best Actress (Selen Ucer – Ece Dizdar)
2020 Antalya Golden Orange 
Best Actress (Selen Ucer)
SIYAD Turkish Film Critics Association Best Film Award
2020 KAV Foundation The Director of The Year Award
2021 Mostra Fire!! Barcelona LGBT+ Film Festival – Best Film
2021 Inside Out, Toronto 2SLGBTQ+ Film Festival – Audience Award
2021 Outfest LA Grand Jury Award – Outstanding Screenwriting in an International Feature
2021 aGliff/ Prism Austin – All Genders, Lifestyles, and Identities Film Festival – Best Narrative Jury Prize

As writer
Teyzem (My Aunt) (1986) (Director: Halit Refiğ) (Milliyet Newspaper Screenplay Competition, First Prize)
Milyarder (The Billionaire) (1987) (Director: Kartal Tibet)
Hayallerim, Aşkım ve Sen (My Dreams, My Love and You) (1987) (Director: Atıf Yılmaz)
Arkadaşım Şeytan (The Devil My Friend) (1988) (Director: Atıf Yılmaz) 
Piano Piano Bacaksız (Piano Piano Shorty) (1989) (Director: Tunç Başaran)
Berlin in Berlin (1992) (Director: Sinan Çetin)
Amerikalı (The American) (1993) (Director: Şerif Gören)
Yaz Yagmuru (Summer Rain) (1993) (Director: Tomris Giritlioğlu)

Published books
Amerikan Güzeli (American Beauty) (1993) (Stories, Oglak Publishing)
Aşkın Alfabesi (The Alphabet of Love) (1996) (Novel, İyi Seyler Publishing) 
Kuyruk (The Tail) (2001) (Novel, Oglak Publishing)
Işık Gölge Oyunları (Light And Shadow Play) (2012) (Autobiography, Yapı Kredi Publishing)

External links
 Personal Blog
 

Turkish film directors
Turkish male writers
1965 births
Living people
Turkish male screenwriters